Bactridium is a genus of root-eating beetles in the family Monotomidae. There are about 18 described species in Bactridium.

Species
These 29 species belong to the genus Bactridium:

 Bactridium adustum Reitter, 1873 i c g
 Bactridium angulicolle Reitter, 1873 i c g
 Bactridium angustum Sharp, 1900 i c g
 Bactridium atratum Reitter, 1876
 Bactridium brevicolle Reitter, 1876
 Bactridium californicum Fall, 1917 i c g
 Bactridium cephalotes (Pascoe, 1863)
 Bactridium convexulum Casey, 1916 i c g
 Bactridium cubaense Chevrolat, 1863 i c g
 Bactridium curtipenne Casey, 1916 i c g
 Bactridium divisum Sharp, 1900 i c g
 Bactridium ephippiger (Guérin-Méneville, 1837)
 Bactridium ephippigerum (Guerin-Meneville, 1829) i c g b
 Bactridium erythropterum (Melsheimer, 1844) i c g b
 Bactridium exiguum Grouvelle, 1908 i c g
 Bactridium flohri Sharp, 1900 i c g
 Bactridium fryi Horn, 1879
 Bactridium germanum Sharp, 1900 i c g
 Bactridium heydeni Reitter, 1873 i c g
 Bactridium hudsoni Casey, 1916 i c g
 Bactridium humile Grouvelle, 1906
 Bactridium insularis Van Dyke, 1953
 Bactridium nanus (Erichson, 1843)
 Bactridium obscurum Casey, 1916 i c g b
 Bactridium orientalis (Reitter, 1872)
 Bactridium parvum Grouvelle, 1906
 Bactridium quadricollis (Reitter, 1872)
 Bactridium rude Sharp, 1900 i c g
 Bactridium striolatum (Reitter, 1872) i c g b

Data sources: i = ITIS, c = Catalogue of Life, g = GBIF, b = Bugguide.net

References

Further reading

 
 
 
 
 
 
 

Monotomidae
Cucujoidea genera